Paul Hearty is an Irish Gaelic footballer who played as goalkeeper for the Armagh county team. He was named in goal for the 2006 Irish News Ulster Allstars team for his performances in Armagh's 2006 Uster championship win.

Club
Hearty was part of the Crossmaglen team that won 13 Armagh Senior Football Championships in a row between 1996 and 2008. This equals the national record for consecutive county football championships set by Ballina Stephenites of Mayo between 1904 and 1916. The 2008 win was Crossmaglen's 37th in all, also drawing them level with Castleblayney Faughs's record of most county football championships ever. Hearty has also won the Ulster Senior Club Football Championship seven times and the All-Ireland Senior Club Football Championship four times with the club. Hearty, along with Oisín McConville, John McEntee, Tony McEntee, Francie Bellew and Cathal Short is one of six Crossmaglen players to have shared in all these successes since 1996.

Hearty retired from the Crossmaglen Rangers in 2017 at the age of 39 but came out of retirement in 2018 for one game at the age of 40 as an emergency goalkeeper a year later in a league match against Armagh harps. He also filled-in as substitute goalkeeper for Crossmaglen in the 2020 county final against Maghery at the age of 42 but did not play. Crossmaglen lost the match 0-17 to 4-09. This was the first time they had lost a county final in 38 years.

County
Hearty also was substitute goalkeeper on the 2002 All-Ireland winning football team, and played on the losing side the following year against Tyrone. He has 6 ulster championship medals a national league and was nominated for an all-star in 2005.

Honours
 Ulster Senior Football Championship (5): 2002, 2004, 2005, 2006, 2008
 National Football League, Division 1 (1): 2005
 National Football League, Division 2 (1): 2010
 Ulster Under-21 Football Championship (1): 1998
 Armagh Senior Football Championship (19): 1996, 1997, 1998, 1999, 2000, 2001, 2002, 2003, 2004, 2005, 2006, 2007, 2008, 2010, 2011, 2012, 2013, 2014, 2015
 Ulster Senior Club Football Championship (11): 1996, 1998, 1999, 2004, 2006, 2007, 2008, 2010, 2011, 2012, 2015
 All-Ireland Senior Club Football Championship (6): 1997, 1999, 2000, 2007, 2011, 2012 
 Irish News Ulster All-Stars (2): 2005 2006

References

1978 births
Living people
Armagh inter-county Gaelic footballers
Crossmaglen Rangers Gaelic footballers
Gaelic football goalkeepers
People from Armagh (city)